Bharatpur Hospital is a governmental hospital situated in Bharatpur Metropolitan City in Chitwan District of Nepal.

References

Hospitals in Nepal
Buildings and structures in Bharatpur, Nepal